The Star Omnibus Company and its predecessor the Andrews Star Omnibus Company, was a bus operator in London between 1892 and 1908.

Overview 

Solomon Andrews entered into agreement with the London General Omnibus Company in 1886 to supply Andrews patent buses. The Andrews patent bus represented an improvement in design over the vehicles previously used. They were so successful that by 1891, 26 buses had been supplied.

Andrews Star Omnibus Company

On 4 October 1892, a limited company was formed, Andrews Star Omnibus Company Limited, to take over the business of some buses which had been operating since 1888 under the name of S. Andrews & Son. The Directors were Solomon Andrews and his son, Francis Emile. The General Manager was William Alexander Perry. The company was based at 31-47 New Kent Road, leased from Samuel Plimsoll.

In 1892 the routes of the company were as follows:
1 Elephant and Islington, 23 buses
2 Camberwell and Kings Cross, 10 buses
3 Edgware Road and Gower Street, 4 buses
4 Camberwell and Victoria, 14 buses

Later routes were added as follows:
5 Camberwell and Clapham, 8 January 1893
6 Hop Exchange and Gracechurch Street, 22 April 1893
7 Tower Bridge, July 1896
8 Peckham and Dulwich, July 1896
9 Farringdon Road
10 Walham Green and Wandsworth

Star Omnibus Company

On 4 March 1899 the Star Omnibus Company (London) Limited was formed to take over the business of the Andrews Star Omnibus Company. The directors were the same and William Alexander Perry was the Managing Director.

By 1900 the company had 196 buses, and 1,797 horses. The company continued to expand and by 1902 there were 246 buses and 1,905 horses. In this year, there were negotiations with the London General Omnibus Company for it to take over the company for £222,750 (equivalent to £ in ), but the deal was unsuccessful. The company started to experience financial difficulties, reportedly because of the increase in electric tramway services in London.

In 1905 the company purchased some motor buses, but these were unreliable and failed to deliver any profit for the company. The situation deteriorated, and the company withdrew the motor buses on 9 August 1907.

In line with most other bus operators in London, there was a significant drop in profit, and the Star Omnibus Company was unable to withstand the competition from the London Underground and the tramway services. The company was wound up on 21 February 1908.

Surviving vehicles

When the company ceased trading, the brother of William Alexander Perry, A.J. Perry purchased some vehicles and three of these survived.

1875 Knifeboard Bus

This bus was owned by Bertram Mills Circus. It was then operated on a service between Chessington South railway station and Chessington Zoo from 1944 to 1948. It was obtained by a descendant of Solomon Andrews, John Andrews in 1963. It was renovated and took part in the George Shillibeer 150th anniversary in 1979. It was given to the London Bus Museum in 2007.

1890 Three Light Garden Seat Bus

This bus was owned by Bertram Mills Circus. It was then operated on a service between Chessington South railway station and Chessington Zoo from 1944 to 1948. It was sold to Car Mart, then George Mathey, and put on display at the Tyrwhitt-Drake Museum of Carriages at Maidstone. In 1967 it was purchased by Temple Smith of Chicago. Back from the United States of America in 1989, it was restored. It was given to the London Bus Museum in 2007.

1890 Four Light Garden Seat Bus

The bus passed into the ownership of Job Master Robert Barley, then Dollond & Aitchison. Bernard Mills bought it in 1948 and then it went to Tim Richards of Gawsworth Hall. It was renovated and took part in the George Shillibeer 150th anniversary in 1979 and operated a service to London Zoo. The Andrews family took it back to Cardiff in 1988 for restoration, and it was given to the London Bus Museum in 2007. It is on loan to the Beamish Museum.

See also 
 Buses in London

References 

Transport companies established in 1892
1892 establishments in England
Former London bus operators